Ercan Kara (born 3 January 1996) is an Austrian professional footballer who plays as a forward for Major League Soccer club Orlando City and the Austria national team.

He has previously played for Slovan HAC, Austria Wien II, FC Mauerwerk, SV Horn and Rapid Wien across five divisions of the Austrian football pyramid.

Club career

Slovan HAC
Kara came through the Slovan HAC youth system. On 13 November 2011, he made his senior debut for Slovan's first team as a 15-year-old in the fourth-tier Wiener Stadtliga as a 60th-minute substitute for Burak Özbek in a 5–1 defeat at home to Nußdorfer AC. In his debut season, Kara made ten league appearances and a further appearance in the local Wiener Cup, but did not score. On 25 May 2013, Kara scored his first senior goal for Slovan, in a 3–2 Wiener Stadtliga defeat against Post SV Wien. It was his only goal of the season in 29 appearances. Slovan took voluntary relegation to the sixth tier Wiener Oberliga A. In the 2013–14 season, Kara scored 32 goals in 27 Oberliga appearances but the team did not achieve promotion following a seventh-place finish.

Austria Wien II
Ahead of the 2014–15 season, 18-year-old Kara signed with Austria Wien, spending two seasons with the club's reserve team in the third-tier Regionalliga Ost. He made 16 appearances and scored once. His playing time was limited as academy director Ralf Muhr expressed doubts about his fitness level.

FC Mauerwerk
In 2016, Kara returned to the Wiener Stadtliga with Karabakh Wien (later renamed FC Mauerwerk in 2018). Kara finished his first season with the team as the Wiener Stadtliga top goalscorer with 35 goals in 30 appearances as the team won the division title and promotion to the Regionalliga Ost. In the following two seasons, Kara again led the league in goals with 26 and 22 goals respectively as FC Mauerwerk earned 5th-place and 2nd-place finishes.

SV Horn
In July 2019, Kara signed with SV Horn of the 2. Liga. He made his competitive SV Horn debut on 20 July 2019 in an ÖFB Cup first round game against FCM Traiskirchen, scoring twice in a 5–1 victory. He made his 2. Liga debut six days later, scoring another two goals as Horn beat Austria Wien II 5–1. With 13 goals in 16 appearances in his debut 2. Liga, Kara attracted first division interest and was sold by Horn after only six months.

Rapid Wien
In January 2020, Austrian Bundesliga club Rapid Wien signed Kara to a two-and-a-half year contract. He made his debut on 23 February 2020, entering as an 81st-minute substitute for Christoph Knasmüllner with Rapid trailing 2–1 to TSV Hartberg and scored a 90+3rd-minute game-tying goal. In total, Kara scored three goals in nine appearances in the second half of the season. In his first full season with the club, Kara appeared in all 32 Bundesliga games and scored 15 goals, the fourth-highest in the league and the most in the Rapid squad. He also made his continental debut during the 2020–21 season, on 26 August 2020 against Lokomotiva Zagreb in the UEFA Champions League second qualifying round, scoring the only goal in a 1–0 win. The team lost in the third qualifying round, dropping them in to the 2020–21 UEFA Europa League group stage. Kara scored two Europa League goals, both in a 3–1 win over Irish team Dundalk, as Rapid finished third behind Arsenal and Molde. In March 2021, Rapid head coach Dietmar Kühbauer likened Kara's height, acrobatic ability and goalscoring prowess to that of a Zlatan Ibrahimović with fans later nicknaming him "Karabrimovic" on social media.

Orlando City
On 27 January 2022, with only six months left on his Rapid contract, Kara was sold to Major League Soccer team Orlando City ahead of the 2022 season for a reported $800,000. He signed a three-year Designated Player contract with additional club options in 2025 and 2026. Ercan scored his first goal in U.S. Open Cup competition on May 10, 2022, during a 2-1 round of 32 victory over the Philadelphia Union.

International career
Born in Austria, Kara is of Turkish descent and was also eligible to represent Turkey internationally. In January 2021, Kara said in a press conference that while he was aware Turkey was monitoring him and would consider representing them, he had only been contacted by Austrian officials. In March 2021, Franco Foda called up Kara to the Austria national team for the first time. He made his national team debut on 31 March 2021, coming on as a 74th-minute substitute for Xaver Schlager in a 4–0 2022 FIFA World Cup qualifying loss to Denmark. The game was played behind closed doors at Ernst-Happel-Stadion in his hometown, Vienna. In April 2021, Turkey manager Şenol Güneş admitted that he had missed out on cap-tying Kara having not been able to travel to Austria to watch him in person due to the COVID-19 pandemic. On 9 October 2021, Kara made his first start in Austria's 2–0 away win against the Faroe Islands in World Cup qualification, assisting the opening goal scored by Konrad Laimer.

Career statistics

Club

International
As of 15 November 2021

Honours
FC Mauerwerk
Wiener Stadtliga: 2016–17

Orlando City
U.S. Open Cup: 2022

Individual
Wiener Stadtliga golden boot: 2016–17
Regionalliga Ost golden boot: 2017–18, 2018–19

References

External links 

Living people
1996 births
Austrian footballers
Austria international footballers
Austrian people of Turkish descent
Austrian Landesliga players
Austrian Regionalliga players
2. Liga (Austria) players
Austrian Football Bundesliga players
Major League Soccer players
FC Mauerwerk players
SV Horn players
SK Rapid Wien players
Orlando City SC players
Designated Players (MLS)
Austrian expatriate footballers
Austrian expatriate sportspeople in the United States
Expatriate soccer players in the United States
Association football forwards